Alburnoides nicolausi, is a fish species of the family Cyprinidae, known from Iran. I can be differentiated from its cogenerates by differences in fin ray and vertebral counts, together with other morphological characters.

References

Further reading
Turan, Davut, et al. "Alburnoides manyasensis (Actinopterygii, Cyprinidae), a new species of cyprinid fish from Manyas Lake basin, Turkey." ZooKeys 276 (2013): 85.
Roudbar, Arash Jouladeh, et al. "A molecular approach to the genus Alburnoides using COI sequences data set and the description of a new species, A. damghani, from the Damghan River system (the Dasht-e Kavir Basin, Iran)(Actinopterygii, Cyprinidae)." ZooKeys 579 (2016): 157.

Alburnoides
Taxa named by Nina Gidalevna Bogutskaya
Taxa named by Brian W. Coad
Fish described in 2009
Fish of Iran